Parkinsonia texana is a species of perennial flowering tree in the pea family, Fabaceae, native to Texas and the Mexican states of Coahuila, Nuevo Leon, San Luis Potosi, and Tamaulipas. Common names include Texas palo verde, Border palo verde, and Retama china.

It is heat and drought tolerant and prefers alkaline soils. Its thin bark is green in color and its flowers, which are typically yellow but sometimes red, bloom from April to June.

References 

texana
Plants described in 1876
North American desert flora
Trees of the Southwestern United States
Flora of Texas
Trees of Coahuila
Trees of Nuevo León
Trees of Tamaulipas
Flora of the Rio Grande valleys
Flora without expected TNC conservation status